Saroj Ghose (born 1   September 1935) is an Indian science popularizer and museum maker. He was the director of Birla Industrial & Technological Museum and director general of the National Council of Science Museums, Government of India. He was also the President of the International Council of Museums in Paris during 1992–98. He won many awards including one for "Best Effort in Science Popularisation Amongst Children". He has also mentored some of India's best Museum Developers.

Education
Ghose graduated in Electrical Communication Engineering at Jadavpur University, Kolkata. He received a master's degree from Harvard University and a Ph.D. from the Smithsonian Institution.

Awards and distinctions

 1997 ASTC Fellowship
 1989 Padma Shri in Science & Engineering
 2007 Padma Bhushan in Science and Engineering

Advisor

 Gujarat Science City, Ahmedabad
 Parliament Museum, New Delhi
 Rashtrapati Bhavan Museum, New Delhi, India

References

1935 births
Living people
Scientists from Kolkata
Museum founders
Jadavpur University alumni
Harvard University alumni
Recipients of the Padma Shri in science & engineering
Recipients of the Padma Bhushan in science & engineering
20th-century Indian engineers
Engineers from West Bengal